New Washington is the name of several places:

United States:
New Washington, Indiana
New Washington, Ohio
New Washington, Pennsylvania
A former name of Morgan's Point, Texas during the early 19th century

Philippines:
New Washington, Aklan

In fiction:
See Planets and habitats of the Night's Dawn trilogy as to a planet in Peter F. Hamilton's The Night's Dawn Trilogy